Zebić is a surname. Notable people with the surname include:

Dalibor Zebić (born 1972), Croatian footballer and manager
Maja Zebić (born 1982), Croatian handballer
Zlatko Zebić (born 1979), Serbian footballer

Serbian surnames
Croatian surnames